The following is a list of state or nationally designated historic sites and buildings in Wood County, Texas.

List

References 

Wood County, Texas
Lists of historic places